James Grubbs Martin (born December 11, 1935) is an American chemist and politician who served as the 70th governor of North Carolina from 1985 to 1993. He was the third Republican elected to the office after Reconstruction, and the fifth overall. , he was also the only Republican to serve two full terms as governor of the state.

Early life and education
James Grubbs Martin was born on December 11, 1935, in Savannah, Chatham County, Georgia and subsequently raised in South Carolina. He graduated from Davidson College in 1957 with a Bachelor of Science degree. Shortly after graduation, on June 1, he married Dorothy Ann McAulay of Charlotte, North Carolina. An avid tuba player, he was a member of Phi Mu Alpha Sinfonia music fraternity and Beta Theta Pi Social Fraternity while an undergraduate at Davidson.

Academic career
Martin received his PhD in chemistry from Princeton University in 1960, after completing a doctoral dissertation titled "Stereochemistry of the Diels-Alder reaction." He then served as an associate professor of chemistry at his alma mater Davidson College until 1972. As a professor at Davidson, he advised the school's Young Republicans chapter.

Political career
Martin registered as a member of the Republican Party in 1961 or 1962. He later explained, "I joined with the minority party because I felt the south needed two-party competition." In 1966, he was elected to the Mecklenburg County Board of Commissioners. He served for seven years, chairing the body from 1967 to 1968, and briefly in 1971. He was a president of the North Carolina Association of County Commissioners.

House of Representatives (1973–1985)
He was elected to the United States House of Representatives in 1972 representing the Charlotte-based 9th Congressional district.  He served there for six terms. He served as a Ways and Means Committee member, and as a House Republican Research Committee chairman. He became the first elected official to receive the Charles Lathrop Parsons Award, given by the American Chemical Society for outstanding public service by an American chemist, in 1983.

In 1984, with incumbent governor Jim Hunt leaving office due to the term limit, Martin ran for the Republican nomination and won.  He defeated state attorney general Rufus Edmisten by a nine-point margin.  He was helped by the coattails from Ronald Reagan's landslide re-election victory.  He was also helped when Lieutenant Governor Jimmy Green endorsed him after being defeated by Edmisten in the Democratic primary.  Green was from eastern North Carolina, and his endorsement helped Martin win support among conservative Democrats in that part of the state.

Governor of North Carolina (1985–1993)

While most political figures running for office were prone to make promises covering a wide range of issues from education to health care, Martin made one promise that garnered a lot of attention; he said he would address all of the priorities in the state, but his only promise was that construction on Interstate 40 from Raleigh to Wilmington, North Carolina would be finished before he left office. The long-neglected and last leg of I-40 from Barstow, California would open up the southeastern coastal area to the rest of the state.  He was true to his promise; the last unfinished leg of I-40 was finished before the end of his first term.

Martin was easily reelected in 1988, defeating Lieutenant Governor Bob Jordan by 13 points. In so doing, he became the only member of his party to have been elected to two terms as governor of North Carolina. He was part of a 28-year trend of Governors of North Carolina who were named James, having been preceded and succeeded by Jim Hunt, who in turn was preceded in his first term by James Holshouser.

Later life
In 1993, he retired from political life and became chairman of the board of the James Cannon Research Center of Carolinas Medical Center in Charlotte, NC. In 2012, he was appointed to lead an investigation into academic improprieties at the University of North Carolina at Chapel Hill. For the United States presidential election in 2016 Martin endorsed fellow Republican John Kasich.

Works 
 Revelation through Science (2016)

Legacy
In January 2017, the Pope Center for Higher Education Policy changed its name to the James G. Martin Center for Academic Renewal, named after Governor Martin. Gov. Martin also serves on the board of directors for the Martin Center.

Gallery

References

Works cited

External links

 Official
James G. Martin Papers, 1973–1992 at the University of North Carolina
 General information

1935 births
21st-century American chemists
21st-century American non-fiction writers
20th-century American politicians
Academics from South Carolina
American male non-fiction writers
Beta Theta Pi
County commissioners in North Carolina
Davidson College alumni
Davidson College faculty
Living people
Republican Party governors of North Carolina
People from Savannah, Georgia
Phi Mu Alpha Sinfonia
Politicians from Charlotte, North Carolina
Princeton University alumni
Republican Party members of the United States House of Representatives from North Carolina
Writers about religion and science
Writers from Charlotte, North Carolina
21st-century American male writers
Members of Congress who became lobbyists